Novelsis is a genus of beetles in the family Dermestidae, containing the following species:

 Novelsis aequalis (Sharp, 1902)
 Novelsis andersoni Beal, 1954
 Novelsis athlophora Beal, 1954
 Novelsis bitaeniatus Steinheil, 1869
 Novelsis brasiliensis Pic, 1923
 Novelsis gounellei Pic, 1915
 Novelsis horni Jayne, 1882
 Novelsis perplexa Jayne, 1882
 Novelsis picta Casey, 1900
 Novelsis timia Beal, 1954
 Novelsis uteana Casey, 1900
 Novelsis varicolor Jayne, 1882

References

Dermestidae genera